Aunt Arctic Adventure is a platform game released in 1988 by Mindware for the Amiga. The player guides Charlie the chimp through the various levels to rescue his aunt, who was kidnapped and taken to the Arctic to work as a circus performer.

Gameplay

The game can played by one or two players.  If two, the second player controls Penguin Pete.  Actual gameplay involves picking up bananas and treasures to earn extra points while avoiding enemies such as Eskimos, spiders, and penguins, as well as traps like pitfalls, flying daggers and axes, and burning floors. A handful of levels have additional challenges, such as reduced/absent lighting, and traps disguised as sections of wall that are tripped by the player.

Aunt Arctic Adventure has 50 levels.  The levels include things such as invisible walls, ropes and ladders to climb on, hurdles to jump, etc.  Completing the game requires logic and puzzle-solving skills as well as fast reflexes. Generally, the game was divided into "sets" of four levels each, which shared the same music (except for levels without a music trigger) and enemies, and the fourth level of a set was usually arranged as an obstacle course that was more straightforward, but deadlier.

Reception
Info gave the game 4 stars and said "The graphics are almost too cute, and the music is bright and snappy. Joystick control is smooth, and the scenery scrolls across and up and down seamlessly."

Reviews
Joystick Hebdo (French)
Aktueller Software Markt (German)
Power Play (German)

References

External links
Aunt Arctic Adventure at Lemon Amiga
Aunt Arctic Adventure at Amiga Hall of Light

1988 video games
Amiga games
Amiga-only games
Fictional penguins
Platform games
Video games about birds
Video games about primates
Video games developed in Germany
Video games set in the Arctic